Daria Viktorovna Akhmerova (born 14 April 1999) is a Russian weightlifter. She won the gold medal in the women's 87kg event at the 2021 European Weightlifting Championships held in Moscow, Russia.

Career 

She represented Kazakhstan at the 2019 Junior World Weightlifting Championships held in Suva, Fiji and she won the gold medal in the women's 87kg event.

At the 2021 European Junior & U23 Weightlifting Championships in Rovaniemi, Finland, she won the gold medal in her event. She also won the bronze medal in the clean & jerk in the women's 87kg event at the 2021 World Weightlifting Championships held in Tashkent, Uzbekistan.

Achievements

References

External links 
 

Living people
1999 births
Place of birth missing (living people)
Russian female weightlifters
Kazakhstani female weightlifters
European Weightlifting Championships medalists
21st-century Russian women